Women's Huron Valley Correctional Facility  (WHV) is a prison for women located in Pittsfield Township, Michigan, operated by the  Michigan Department of Corrections (MDOC).  The three-letter designation for this facility is WHV. It is the only prison in Michigan which houses women.

General
The prison is in Region 3, Washtenaw County, and houses security levels I, II and IV. It has two perimeter fences with electronic detection devices and security cameras, both audio and video. The facility is authorized 364 guards, but is rarely at full strength. Only female guards are used in the housing units for fear of sexual assault by male staff members.

History
The prison opened in December 2005. It included thirteen housing units for 1,100 inmates in the general population and housing for specialized programs. The prison shared personnel, prisoner records, maintenance operations and business offices with the adjacent Huron Valley Men's Complex, until that complex was closed in 2009 so that women could be moved in from the Robert Scotts Correctional Facility. At this time the facility name was changed from Huron Valley Women's Complex.

Capacity was increased by five hundred in 2010. Press reports in 2018 said the facility had a capacity of 2,400. At that time, the complex housed 2,100 people. The population reached a maximum of 2,257 in 2015.

The prison was the center of lawsuit concerning forced overtime by the guards. Two years later the state paid $750,000 to settle the matter.

Press reports in 2019 stated that the facility suffered from overcrowding and leaking roofs. Storage areas had been converted to housing units in violation of building codes.

Food Rescue
Women in the prison's horticulture program operate a half-acre organic garden inside the prison which contributes 40% of the produce donated to the Washtenaw County Food Gatherers food rescue program.

Notable inmates
Gwendolyn Graham, serial killer
 Sharee Miller, murderer 
 Nancy Seaman, murderer

See also

 List of Michigan state prisons

References

External links
 Women's Huron Valley Correctional Facility (WHV)

Prisons in Michigan
Buildings and structures in Washtenaw County, Michigan
Women's prisons in the United States
2005 establishments in Michigan
Women in Michigan